Gravity FM is a community radio station based in Grantham, Lincolnshire.  Broadcasting full-time since 1 December 2008 on 97.2FM and online, the station has completed its first licence period and, as a result, has obtained a further five year extension from OFCOM, the industry regulator, with similar Key Commitments.

Broadcast content
Gravity FM broadcasts content produced by volunteers from the local community.  Mainstream daytime programming is music led and includes news, traffic, travel and local information.  During the evenings the station broadcasts a variety of more specialist programs and features.

Funding and awards
Gravity FM has so far been successful in securing funding to maintain its service provision.  Like all community radio stations in the UK, it is capped in only being allowed to raise half its income annually from advertising and on-air commercial arrangements.  The remainder is found in the form of grants, off-air sponsorship and fundraising.

The Friends of Gravity FM is a charity (registered for tax purposes in the UK) established in 2012 to support the provision of community broadcasting services in the Grantham area.  The station has benefited greatly from the donations they have made towards new equipment.

References

External links
 Main Website - gravityfm.net
 Gravity FM on Facebook
 Gravity FM on SoundCloud
 Gravity FM on Twitter
 Gravity FM on YouTube

2008 establishments in England
Community radio stations in the United Kingdom
Grantham
Radio stations established in 2008
Radio stations in Lincolnshire